Rideau Park School is a public primary school in southwest Edmonton, Alberta. It is a part of Edmonton Public Schools and serves grades Kindergarten through 6. It has a German-English bilingual program.  it has 248 students.

History
The school opened in 1977.

Operations
 the school places a heavy emphasis on standardized testing as classroom practices may be consistent and so students' results may be compared to those of other schools. The scores on the Alberta Achievement Test are used in determining which changes need to be made to the curriculum. Rideau Park gives an Individualized Program Plan (IPP) to each student who performs below the designated grade level in the Highest Level of Achievement Test (HLT) and not only to special education and special needs students.

References
 Ouchi, William G. Making Schools Work: A Revolutionary Plan to Get Your Children the Education They Need. Simon & Schuster, June 24, 2008. , 9781439108109. See section "Rideau Park School Responds to Students as Individuals—Based on Data"

Reference notes

External links
 Rideau Park School

Elementary schools in Alberta
Elementary schools in Edmonton
1977 establishments in Alberta
Educational institutions established in 1977